Bedřich Dvořák (10 November 1930 – 14 March 2018) was a Czechoslovak sprint canoeist who competed in the early 1950s. He finished seventh in the K-2 10000 m event at the 1952 Summer Olympics in Helsinki with Rudolf Klabouch. Dvořák was a coach and father of a canoer Libor Dvořák and grandfather of Filip Dvořák.

References
Bedřich Dvořák's profile at Sports Reference.com
Bedřich Dvořák's obituary 

1930 births
2018 deaths
Canoeists at the 1952 Summer Olympics
Czechoslovak male canoeists
Olympic canoeists of Czechoslovakia